Cokato can refer to a community in the United States:

 Cokato, Minnesota
 Cokato Township, Minnesota